Elias Diab, a Lebanese photographer born in 1978.

Career 
He decided on a career as a photographer in 1999. His work has since appeared in several of Lebanon's many Publications and Magazines. He was the official photographer of Melhem Karam, Head of the Lebanese Journalist Union in 2000.

He established the "Beyond the Image" company in 2005 and started in 2008.

From his list of events 
Adel Emam Daughter's wedding (2004)
Garrou concert official photographer (2005)
Kathem Al Saher concert (2006)
Laurrent Gerra (2007)

References

Living people
Lebanese photographers
Year of birth missing (living people)